Goosepen Run is a stream in the U.S. state of West Virginia.

Goosepen Run was so named on account of the flocks of wild birds which flew over the area.

See also
List of rivers of West Virginia

References

Rivers of Lewis County, West Virginia
Rivers of West Virginia